The 2019 1. divisjon (referred to as OBOS-ligaen for sponsorship reasons) was a Norwegian second-tier football league season. 

Aalesund set a new record for most points in a 1. divisjon season with 79. They surpassed IK Start's previous record of 74 points, from the 2004 season.

Season summary
On 20 October, Aalesund secured both promotion and league title with three games to spare by winning 1–0 away over Tromsdalen. The same day, Tromsdalen were the first team to be relegated as their defeat coincided with a victory for Strømmen. On 2 November, Sandefjord secured promotion to the first tier with one match to spare after their 1–0 win over Jerv at Komplett Arena. On the same day, Skeid were the second team to be relegated as their draw against Notodden meant that survival was out of reach before the ultimate round.

Teams
In the 2018 1. divisjon, Viking and Mjøndalen were promoted to the 2019 Eliteserien, while Åsane, Florø and Levanger were relegated to the 2019 2. divisjon.

Start and Sandefjord were relegated from the 2018 Eliteserien, while Raufoss, Skeid and KFUM Oslo were promoted from the 2018 2. divisjon.

Stadia and personnel

1Skeid played their home games at Intility Arena from 25 May 2019.
2Strømmen played their last home game at Jessheim Stadion due to nonapproved floodlights at Strømmen Stadion.

Managerial changes

League table

Positions by round

Results

1Due to a frozen pitch at Sandnes Stadion, the game was cancelled and the result was set to 0–3.

Play-offs

Promotion play-offs

The 3rd to 6th placed teams took part in the promotion play-offs; these were single-leg knockout matches. In the first round, the fifth-placed team played at home against the sixth-placed team. The winner of the first round then met the fourth-placed team on away ground in the second round. The winner of the second round then met the third-placed team on away ground. The winner of the third round advanced to play the 14th-placed team in Eliteserien over two legs in the Eliteserien play-offs for a spot in the top-flight next season.

First round

Second round

Third round

Relegation play-offs

The 14th placed team took part in a two-legged play-off against the winners of the 2. divisjon play-offs to decide who would play in the 2020 1. divisjon.

Åsane won 5–3 on aggregate.

Season statistics

Top scorers

Top assists

Attendances

References

Norwegian First Division seasons
1
Norway
Norway